Nicole Riegel is an American film director, screenwriter, and producer.

Early life and education 
Riegel grew up in Jackson, Ohio, a rust belt town in the Appalachian foothills. At the age of 15, she entered a local beauty pageant and won, but gave an acceptance speech discussing why such pageants debased women and her title was removed. She wanted to be a film director and applied to art schools, but though she received acceptances she joined the Army National Guard and was stationed at Fort Jackson, SC. After her tour ended she attended Wright State University in Dayton, Ohio, graduating in 2009 with a film degree. She moved to Los Angeles and worked while attending UCLA, graduating with an MFA.

Career 
Riegel produced a script entitled Dogfight which she attempted to get interest in; after she signed with Anonymous Content, the script eventually made it onto The Black List in 2013.

Riegel's first film was the semi-autobiographical Holler (2020); it was based on ideas developed in a 2016 short with the same title. The plot follows a seventeen-year-old Appalachian girl growing up in poverty who scavenges scrap metal from local shuttered factories to raise the money she needs to attend college. The film is based on and was filmed in Jackson, Ohio.

IFC Films acquired distribution rights to her second film, Dandelion, starring Kiki Layne; the film was due to start filming in Cincinnati and South Dakota in late 2022. Release was planned for 2023.

Recognition 
Filmmaker Magazine named her one of their 25 New Faces of Independent Film in 2014. In 2020, Variety named her one of 10 Directors to Watch. Vulture called her a "major new directorial talent". Variety said Holler "positions the UCLA graduate as the Debra Granik of her generation".

References 

American women film directors
American women screenwriters
Filmmakers from Ohio
Wright State University alumni
University of California, Los Angeles alumni
People from Jackson County, Ohio
People from Jackson, Ohio
Appalachian people